Bobby Crues (December 31, 1918 – December 26, 1986) was an American professional baseball player who holds the record for most RBIs in a single season.  In 1948, he drove in 254 RBIs for Amarillo of the West Texas-New Mexico League.  The single-season major league record is 191 RBIs which Hack Wilson delivered in 1930 for the Chicago Cubs.  Crues was also a pitcher who in 1940 had a record of 20-5 when he pitched 216 innings.

References

1918 births
1986 births
People from Amarillo, Texas
People from Frisco, Texas
1986 deaths